The Ryan S-C (Sports-Coupe) (or Sport Cabin) was an American three-seat cabin monoplane designed and built by the Ryan Aeronautical Company. At least one was impressed into service with the United States Army Air Forces as the L-10.

Development
The Ryan S-C was a low-wing cantilever monoplane with a fixed tailwheel landing gear, designed to be an up-market version of the Ryan S-T trainer. The prototype first flew in 1937, and had a nose-mounted 150 hp (112 kW) Menasco inline piston engine. Production aircraft were fitted with a 145 hp (108 kW) Warner Super Scarab radial engine. With the company's involvement in producing trainer aircraft for the United States military, the S-C was not seriously marketed, and only 11 complete SCs (s/n 202 through 212) were built, all delivered in 1938; two more were later assembled from parts (s/n 213 in 1941 and s/n 214 in 1959). At least one example – probably as many as five, s/n 202, 203, 207, 211 and 212 – were impressed into service with the Civil Air Patrol, auxiliary of the United States Army Air Forces for anti-submarine patrol and warfare duties on the East coast of the US, and was designated the L-10. At the start of the 21st Century, four examples were still airworthy in the United States.

Variants
S-C later S-C-M
Prototype powered by a 150hp (112kW) Menasco C4S inline engine, one built later converted to S-C-W.
S-C-W
Production aircraft powered by a 145hp (108kW) Warner Super Scarab radial engine, 12 built.
L-10
United States Army Air Forces designation for one S-C-W impressed into service in 1942, it was disposed of in November 1944.
Later Modifications
Two SC-Ws exist with a horizontally opposed 6-cylinder Continental engine.  One was modified from a radial-powered SC-W, and one was built with the 6-cylinder engine after WWII using spare airframe parts from the original pre-WWII production run.

Operators

United States Army Air Forces

Specifications (S-C-W)

See also

References

 
 
 
Aerofiles

External links

1930s United States civil utility aircraft
Ryan aircraft
Low-wing aircraft
Single-engined tractor aircraft
Aircraft first flown in 1937